Ádám Simon (born 30 March 1990) is a Hungarian football player who plays for Szeged-Csanád. He is the twin brother of ex-Liverpool player, András Simon.

Career

Szombathelyi Haladás 
He played his first match in Szombathely on 15 November 2008. He played 44 matches in the Hungarian National Championship I and scored 3 goals, one of which was elected the most beautiful goal of the 2010–11 Nemzeti Bajnokság I season. He scored a goal from 30 meters.

Palermo 
On 8 June 2011, Simon officially moved to Palermo for €980,000. On 24 January 2012, he went on loan to Bari in Serie B, in the transfer that leads to Palermo Massimo Donati. In January 2012, Simon was transferred to Serie B club Bari on loan. Simon made his debut against Nocerina on 4 February 2012 in the 81st minute. In August 2012, he returned to Szombathelyi Haladás on loan. The loan was extended for one more season in July 2013.

On 15 July 2014, Palermo announced to have released Simon for free.

Videoton
On 16 July 2014, Simon was signed by Hungarian League club Videoton FC. Simon signes a four-year contract with the Székesfehérvár-based club.

International career 
Simon was a stable member of U-17, U-19, and also the U-21 teams of Hungary. He was a member of the U-20 Hungary team which won a bronze medal in the FIFA U-20 World Cup in 2009 in Egypt. He participated in the 2011 Toulon Tournament with the U-21.

Club statistics

Updated to games played as of 15 December 2019.

Honours
 FIFA U-20 World Cup:
Third place: 2009

References 

HLSZ

External links
 
 

1990 births
Living people
People from Salgótarján
Hungarian twins
Twin sportspeople
Hungarian footballers
Association football midfielders
MTK Budapest FC players
Szombathelyi Haladás footballers
Palermo F.C. players
S.S.C. Bari players
Fehérvár FC players
Gyirmót FC Győr players
Paksi FC players
Győri ETO FC players
Szeged-Csanád Grosics Akadémia footballers
Nemzeti Bajnokság I players
Nemzeti Bajnokság II players
Serie B players
Hungary youth international footballers
Hungary under-21 international footballers
Hungary international footballers
Hungarian expatriate footballers
Hungarian expatriate sportspeople in Italy
Expatriate footballers in Italy
Sportspeople from Nógrád County